The Ice Cutters is an 1895 painting by J. Alden Weir, and part of the collection of the Portland Art Museum in Portland, Oregon, in the United States.

See also
 1895 in art
 List of works by J. Alden Weir

References

1895 paintings
Collection of the Portland Art Museum